Ken McCarty (born 1958) is an American Republican politician from Alaska. He has represented District 13 as a Member of the Alaska House of Representatives since 2021.

References

External links 
 Ken McCarty at Ballotpedia

Living people
1958 births
Republican Party members of the Alaska House of Representatives
21st-century American politicians